Snenhlanhla Shozi (born 5 May 1997) is a South African rugby sevens player.

Shozi competed for South Africa at the 2018 Rugby World Cup Sevens in San Francisco. In 2022, she was named in South Africa's squad for the Commonwealth Games in Birmingham where they finished in seventh place.

References 

Living people
1997 births
Female rugby sevens players
South Africa international women's rugby sevens players
Rugby sevens players at the 2022 Commonwealth Games